Sloan Cottage is a historic cure cottage located at Saranac Lake in the town of Harrietstown, Franklin County, New York.  It was built about 1907 and is a two-story, wood-frame dwelling sided in plain wood shingles with half-timbering above, with an irregular gable roofline in the Shingle Style.  It features a sleeping porch and first floor sitting-out porch.

It was listed on the National Register of Historic Places in 1992.

References

Houses on the National Register of Historic Places in New York (state)
Houses completed in 1907
Houses in Franklin County, New York
Shingle Style houses
National Register of Historic Places in Franklin County, New York
Shingle Style architecture in New York (state)